Local elections were held on May 9, 2016 in Subic, Zambales, as part of the Philippine general election. In Subic, the voters elected candidates for the local posts in the municipality: mayor, vice mayor, and eight councilors.

Background
Incumbent Mayor Jay Khonghun is running for his third and last term.

Candidates

Mayor

Vice Mayor

Councilors

|-bgcolor=black
|colspan=10|

References

2016 Philippine local elections
Elections in Zambales